Kaingthaung Island is an island in Myanmar. It is located in the Ayeyarwady Region, in the south-central part of the country, 500 km south of the capital Naypyidaw. The area is 11.4 square kilometers.

There is a major settlement on the northeastern part of the island, and several smaller ones on the rest. There is a pagoda by the island, which received damage during the 2004 Sumatra-Andaman earthquake. There have also recently been issues with rising sea levels submerging the island and threatening its residents.

References

Populated places in Ayeyarwady Region
Islands of Myanmar